Nostrum Oil & Gas plc is an oil and gas exploration and production company operating in Kazakhstan. The company is listed on the London Stock Exchange.

History
The company was established as Zhaikmunai LP in 1997 to exploit opportunities in the Kazakhstan and started production in its first field in October 2000. After acquiring interests in three additional fields in August 2012, it changed its name to Nostrum Oil & Gas in December 2013. It was the subject of an initial public offering in June 2014.

Operations
The company operates in the following fields: 
 Chinarevskoye Field
 Rostoshinskoye Field
 Darjinskoye Field
 Yuzhno-Gremyachenskoye Field

References

Oil and gas companies of Kazakhstan
Energy companies established in 1997
Non-renewable resource companies established in 1997
1997 establishments in Kazakhstan
Companies listed on the London Stock Exchange